José Falcón is a district in Presidente Hayes Department of Paraguay, located 48 km North of Asuncion, which one can go from, through the Route 12 (via Héroes del Chaco bridge).

Geography 

Located in the Western region of Paraguay, in the area of Paraguayan Chaco. Its physical appearance is part of the characteristics of the Chaco soil: lowland with abundant vegetation of palm trees. 
It is a coastal city located at the junction between the Pilcomayo and Paraguay rivers. 
This district is located in a lowland area with clay soil. With no meaningful elevations. 
The geography in general at this part of the department is characterized by being swampy, with palm trees and grasses. It is a region that is highly prone to flooding in the rainy seasons of the year.

Limits 

Jose Falcon limits with: 
 North: Here is located the vast territory of Chaco
 South: bordering the town of Chaco'i
 East: with the district of Villa Hayes and Paraguay River
 West: bordered by the city of Clorinda, Argentina and Pilcomayo River

Climate 

The district is located in an area of very hot weather in summer. In Jose Falcon the temperature reaches 44 °C. In winter the temperature can sometimes reach 0 °C. The average annual temperature is 22 °C.

Demographics  

Jose Falcon has 3,808 inhabitants in total, of which 2,014 are men and 1,794 women, according to estimations by the Directorate General of Statistics, Census and Surveys.

The current surface of the young municipality is 1,919 km2, with a population of approximately 9,000 inhabitants.

Economy 

This area is characterized by a high commercial and tourist exchange between Paraguay and Argentina. Its strategic location near the Argentina–Paraguay border, in the Greater Asunción Area, makes commercial traffic  intense. 
The town of Puerto Falcon joins the Argentinian city of Clorinda by the San Ignacio de Loyola International Bridge, on Pilcomayo River. It is a strategic border trade, in the Department of President Hayes.

History 

By law in 1997 the municipality of Jose Falcon was created, as a detachment of the municipality of Villa Hayes. A group of residents organized in a Coordinator Pro municipality prompted the creation of the municipality. 
The area has economic and social infrastructure and a strategic position to enhance sustainable development and become a powerful pole of development.

Tourism 
The city has its own attractiveness of the Chaco region, which makes it an important tourist center, there is also an intense commercial traffic between Paraguay and Argentina which makes it an important source of resources.

The town can be reached by a detour of Route XII "Vice President Sanchez," is a detachment of the town of Villa Hayes.

References

 Geography Illustrated Paraguay, Distributed  by Arami SRL, 2007. 
 Geography of Paraguay, First Edition 1999, Publisher Hispanic Paraguay SRL
World Gazeteer: Paraguay – World-Gazetteer.com

External links  
 National Secretary of Tourism
 Directorate General for Surveys, Statistics and Census
 Paraguayan National Mail

Populated places in the Presidente Hayes Department